Timothy John Radcliffe Barnes, 4th Baron Gorell (2 August 1927 – 25 September 2007) was a British businessman.

He succeeded in the barony upon the death of his father, Ronald Barnes, 3rd Baron Gorell in 1963.

He married Joan Marion Collins in 1954 and had two adopted daughters. Since there was no male issue from this marriage, Lord Gorell was succeeded by his nephew, John Picton Gorell Barnes, only son of his younger brother, Hon. Ronald Alexander Henry Barnes (1931–2003).

See also
Baron Gorell

References

Gorell, Timothy John Radcliffe Barnes, 4th Baron
1927 births
2007 deaths

Gorell